Abu Tamim Ma'ad al-Muizz li-Din Allah (26 September 932 – 19 December 975) was the fourth Fatimid caliph and the 14th Ismaili imam, reigning from 953 to 975. It was during his caliphate that the center of power of the Fatimid dynasty was moved from Ifriqiya (modern Tunisia) to Egypt. The Fatimids founded the city of al-Qāhirah (Cairo) "the Victorious" in 969 as the new capital of the Fatimid caliphate in Egypt.

Political career
After the Fāṭimids, under the third caliph, al-Mansur bi-Nasr Allah, had defeated the Khārijite rebellion of Abu Yazid, they began, under his son al-Mu‘izz, to turn their attentions back to their ambition of establishing their caliphate throughout the Islamic world and overthrowing the Abbasids. Although the Fāṭimids were primarily concerned with Egypt and the Near East, there were nevertheless campaigns fought by General Jawhar as-Siqilli against the Berbers of actual Morocco and the Umayyads of Spain. At the same time, Fatimid raids on Italy enabled naval superiority in the Western Mediterranean to be affirmed, at the expense of Byzantium, even capturing Sicily for a period of time.

The way to Egypt was then clear for the Fāṭimids, the more so given the state of crisis that the incumbent Ikhshidid dynasty found itself in and the inability of the Abbasids to counterattack. The country fell to Jawhar in 969 without any great resistance. After he had secured his position, al-Muʻizz transferred the royal residence from Al-Mansuriya to the newly founded city of Qāhirat al-Muʻizz "al-Muʻizz's Victory", i.e., Cairo, thereby shifting the centre of gravity of the Fatimid realm eastwards. In Africa, the Zirids were installed as regents. In Egypt, several attacks by the Carmathians had to be fought off (972-974) before the restructuring of state finances under Yaqub ibn Killis could be embarked upon. Al-Muʻizz was succeeded by his son Al-Aziz (975-996).

Cultural achievements
Al-Muʻizz was renowned for his tolerance of other religions, and was popular among his Jewish and Christian subjects. He is also credited for having commissioned the invention of the first fountain pen. In 953, al-Muizz demanded a pen which would not stain his hands or clothes, and was provided with a pen which held ink in a reservoir. As recorded by Qadi al-Nu'man al-Tamimi (d. 974) in his Kitāb al-Majālis wa 'l-musayarāt, al-Mu’izz commissioned the construction of the pen instructing:

Fatimid literature rose to a certain degree of prominence in the period of Al Muizz with the emergence of skilled poets like Ibn Hani al Andalusi and Ali al Tunusi. Ibn Hani was often compared to Al Mutanabbi and hailed as the Mutanabbi of the West. Da'a'im al-Islam, the canon law of the Fatimid Caliphate, was completed under Al Mu'izz.

Relationship with Coptic Christians
Coptic Christians were allowed a degree of freedom under al-Muizz. Copts were among those appointed to the highest offices of the empire and were allowed to freely practice their religion. Under Al-Muizz, the viceroy of Syria was Quzman ibn-Nima, a Copt who remained a Christian. The Nayrouz festival, the celebration of the Coptic New Year, was permitted, though prohibitions on some of the activities, such as fire illumination and water splashing, were instituted.

The relationship between al-Muizz and the Copts of Egypt has been the subject of a number of legends written later by Coptic Christians. One such legend involves al-Muizz challenging Pope Abraham of Alexandria to move the Mokattam mountain in Cairo, recalling a verse in the Gospel of Matthew which says:If ye have faith as a grain of mustard seed, ye shall say unto this mountain, Remove hence to yonder place; and it shall remove; and nothing shall be impossible unto you. According to Coptic sources, Pope Abraham of Alexandria ordered the Coptic community to keep vigil and to pray for three days and nights. On the third night, Pope Abraham had a dream in which Mary directed him to search for Simon the Tanner. The legend continues that with the prayers of the Coptic community, led by the Pope and Simon, the Mokattam mountain moved. This story is recounted in the book History of the Patriarchs of Alexandria, written by Severus Ibn al-Muqaffaʿ.

Later Coptic sources would further assert that this miracle led al-Muizz to convert to Christianity, and that he was baptized at the church of Saint Mercurius in Cairo in a baptismal font that continues to exist to this day, known today as the "Sultan's Baptistry". According to this legend al-Muizz abdicated the throne in favor of his son, and spent the rest of his life in a monastery. This story is rejected by influential Muslim historians such as Ahmad Zaki Pasha and Muhammad Abdullah Enan.

Family
Sources differ on al-Mu'izz's consorts. According to one version, he married a cousin of his, who gave him two sons, including his successor al-Aziz. Other sources report that his main consort (al-Sayyida al-Mu'iziyya), and mother of al-Aziz, was a Bedouin slave-girl from Arabia named Durzan, who due to her beautiful singing voice (although this may simply reflect a common stereotype about Arabian women) was nicknamed taghrīd ("twittering"). Al-Mu'izz had several other sons, but two are known by name: Tamim and Abdallah, who was the designated heir-apparent but died before his father. He also had seven daughters, of whom three are known with some detail: Sitt al-Malik, Rashida, and Abda. The last two died in their nineties in 1050, leaving behind enormous fortunes.

See also

List of Ismaili imams
List of rulers of Egypt
List of Shi'a Muslims
Ali ibn Muhammad al-Iyadi

Notes

Sources
 
 
 
 
 
 
 
 Jad Hatem, Le Traité christologique du Calife al-Mu‘izz, le druzisme et le nusayrisme, Paris, Éd. du Cygne, 2013

932 births
975 deaths
Sons of Fatimid caliphs
Ismaili imams
10th-century Arabs
10th-century Fatimid caliphs
Fatimid people of the Arab–Byzantine wars
City founders